Lewis Malcolm Butroid (born 17 September 1998) is an English professional footballer who plays as a left back for Farsley Celtic.

Career

Scunthorpe United 
Born in Gainsborough, Butroid joined Scunthorpe United's academy in 2007 at the age of nine. After progressing through the youth setup, he made his first team debut on 30 August 2016 by starting in a 2–1 home win against Middlesbrough U23 for the EFL Trophy.

On 26 January 2017, Butroid signed a professional 18-month deal with the Iron. He made his Football League debut on 23 September, playing the full 90 minutes in a 2–0 home success over Portsmouth.

He joined National League North side Spennymoor Town on loan in January 2020, but was recalled in February 2020 after making four appearances.

On 27 February 2021, Butroid joined National League North side Hereford on loan. He was released by Scunthorpe when his contract expired, at the end of the 2020-2021 season.

Non-League
On 20 August 2021, Butroid signed a contract for his hometown club Gainsborough Trinity, having previously been on trial with Grimsby Town.

On 18 January 2022, Butroid signed for Worksop Town.

On 22 February 2022, Butroid signed for National League North side Farsley Celtic.

Career statistics

Honours
Individual
League One Apprentice of the Year: 2016–17

References

External links 
 Lewis Butroid profile at the official Scunthorpe United website
 

1998 births
Living people
People from Gainsborough, Lincolnshire
English footballers
Association football defenders
Scunthorpe United F.C. players
Spennymoor Town F.C. players
Hereford F.C. players
Gainsborough Trinity F.C. players
Worksop Town F.C. players
Farsley Celtic F.C. players
English Football League players
National League (English football) players
Northern Premier League players